Abdulaziz Ladan Mohammed (born 7 January 1991 in Jeddah) is a Saudi Arabian middle-distance runner. At the 2012 Summer Olympics, he competed in the Men's 800 metres.

Competition record

References

External links
 
 

Saudi Arabian male middle-distance runners
1991 births
Living people
Olympic athletes of Saudi Arabia
Athletes (track and field) at the 2012 Summer Olympics
Athletes (track and field) at the 2010 Asian Games
Athletes (track and field) at the 2014 Asian Games
Sportspeople from Jeddah
Asian Games competitors for Saudi Arabia
21st-century Saudi Arabian people
20th-century Saudi Arabian people